Sir Percy of Scandia, also known as the original Black Knight, is a fictional character appearing in American comic books published by Marvel Comics. He was a medieval knight created by writer-editor Stan Lee and artist Joe Maneely.

Publication history 
Marvel Comics' first Black Knight, Sir Percy of Scandia, first appeared in the medieval-adventure series Black Knight #1–5 (May–Dec. 1955) from Atlas Comics, the 1950s precursor to Marvel Comics. The five-issue series was written by Stan Lee, with art by Joe Maneely in the first three interiors and all five covers. Fred Kida and the team of penciller Syd Shores and inker Christopher Rule drew stories in the latter two issues.

Sir Percy appeared in Mystic Arcana, representing the element of earth.

Fictional character biography 
The original Black Knight is Sir Percy of Scandia, a 6th-century knight who serves at the court of King Arthur Pendragon as his greatest warrior and one of the Knights of the Round Table. Recruited by the wizard Merlin, Percy adopts a double identity, and pretends to be totally incompetent until changing into the persona of the Black Knight. As the Black Knight, Percy wields the Ebony Blade, which Merlin forged from a meteorite. A constant foe of the evil knight Mordred the Evil (Arthur's traitorous "nephew") and Morgan le Fay, in time Sir Percy retired his dual identity and married Lady Rosamund.

Percy is eventually killed at Castle Scandia by Mordred during the fall of Camelot when stabbed from behind with an enchanted blade made of the same material as his own Ebony Blade – although Mordred then dies himself of wounds inflicted by Arthur during the Battle of Camlann earlier that day. Merlin ensures that Percy's spirit will live on by casting a spell that will revive his ghost if Mordred should ever return.

Sir Percy was survived by a son, Geoffrey. Lady Rosamund later gave birth to his second son, Edward the Posthumous, who reportedly became ancestor of "a proud lineage". Several of Sir Percy's descendants adopted the identity of the Black Knight: Sir Raston, active during the late 6th and early 7th century, who eventually became an agent of the time traveler Kang the Conqueror; and Sir Eobar Garrington, a 12th-century knight serving under Richard the Lionheart during the Third Crusade.

Percy's spirit has appeared several times to counsel his descendant, Dane Whitman. He first appeared as a spirit to act as a mentor to Dane, revealing the circumstances of his death, and appeared a number of times subsequently as a spirit, summoned to give advice. Percy was eventually released from the mortal plane by Doctor Strange.

Percy's spirit again appeared to Dane Whitman, revealing how he wed Lady Rosamund. His spirit then took possession of Dane's body. With Doctor Strange, he fought Morgan le Fay and Balor, and was rescued by Valkyrie. He then made Sean Dolan his squire. Percy's spirit then took possession of the Ebony Blade itself.

Powers and abilities
The Black Knight was an athletic man with no superhuman powers. He was a master of swordsmanship, horseback riding and all forms of combat known in Britain at the time of Camelot. He was also a talented poet, singer and musician with the lute.

Percy wielded the Ebony Blade, and Merlin's spells rendered the Black Knight invulnerable to physical harm as long as he held the Ebony Blade. However, the spells were ineffective against a weapon made of the same metal as the Ebony Blade. He also wore body armor and a helmet which were similarly rendered impenetrable by Merlin's spells.

In other media
 Sir Percy appears in the Spider-Man and His Amazing Friends episode "Knights & Demons", voiced by Vic Perrin. Dane Whitman was also going to appear, but was rejected to avoid confusion.
 Sir Percy appears in Lego Marvel Super Heroes 2. He resides in a castle located in the Medieval England section of Chronopolis, which has been taken over by the Enchantress and Nathan Garrett. After imprisoning Sir Percy, Garrett impersonates him until Captain Avalon, Captain America, Doctor Strange, and Star-Lord defeat the villains and free Sir Percy.

Collected editions

References

External links
 Black Knight (Sir Percy) at Marvel.com
 
 
 
 Black Knight (Sir Percy) at Marvel Wiki

1955 comics debuts
Arthurian characters
Arthurian comics
Atlas Comics characters
Characters created by Joe Maneely
Characters created by Stan Lee
Comics characters introduced in 1955
Fictional knights
Fictional swordfighters in comics
Marvel Comics male superheroes